Adam Clarke Snyder (March 26, 1834 – July 24, 1896) was a justice of the West Virginia Supreme Court.

Biography 

Snyder was educated at Washington College (now Washington and Lee University) in Lexington, Virginia. He received a degree in law at the Lexington Law School. He married Henrietta Cary.

When the Civil War broke, he served with the 27th Virginia Volunteer Infantry (known as the 'Greenbrier Rifles') in the Confederate States Army, returning to his profession at law when the war was ended.

Snyder was a co-founder of the Bank of Lewisburg with Alexander F. Mathews and  Homer A. Holt. The bank opened in 1781 and was the first official bank in the county.
In 1882 he was appointed to the Supreme Court of West Virginia to complete the term of Justice James F. Patton, who died in office. In 1884, Snydor was elected for the next full term, serving until 1890. He died in Lewisburg in 1896.

References 

Greenbrier County WV Heritage 1997, p. 23
 James C. Mohr, Licensed to Practice: The Supreme Court Defines the American Medical Profession
Greenbrier County WV Heritage 1997, p. 9
Cases Decided in the Supreme Court of Appeals of Virginia, Volume 51, p. 352

People from Highland County, Virginia
1834 births
1896 deaths
West Virginia Democrats
Washington and Lee University alumni
Justices of the Supreme Court of Appeals of West Virginia
People of Virginia in the American Civil War
People from Lewisburg, West Virginia
19th-century American judges